Drops are a traditional small, round confectionery made from a mixture of boiled sugar and flavourings. They are "dropped" onto a pan or baking sheet to set. In the 1840s,  drop roller machines came on the market. These machines took the hot, 120 °C, cooked sugar, and molded it into shapes between two hand cranked brass rollers.

See also 
 Acid drop
 Chocolate drop
 Comfit
 Cough drop
 Fruit drop
 Gumdrop
 Kisses (confectionery)
 Lemon drop
 London drops
 Pear drop
 Sponge drop

References 

British confectionery